Herbert Blöcker (1 January 1943 – 15 February 2014) was a German equestrian and 3-time Olympic medalist. He was born in Schleswig-Holstein. He won a silver medal at the Olympics in Fontainebleau in 1980 following by winning another silver in eventing at the 1992 Summer Olympics in Barcelona. During the same Olympic games, he won a bronze medal also in the team event. He also participated in the 1996 Summer Olympics in Atlanta, Georgia. In 2008, both he and his Olympic horse, "Feine Dame", were inducted into the International Association of Eventing Hall of Fame. Blöcker died of cancer on 15 February 2014 at the age of 71 in Elmshorn.

References

1943 births
2014 deaths
German male equestrians
Olympic equestrians of Germany
Olympic equestrians of West Germany
Olympic silver medalists for Germany
Olympic silver medalists for West Germany
Olympic bronze medalists for Germany
Equestrians at the 1976 Summer Olympics
Equestrians at the 1992 Summer Olympics
Equestrians at the 1996 Summer Olympics
Sportspeople from Schleswig-Holstein
Olympic medalists in equestrian
Deaths from cancer in Germany
Medalists at the 1992 Summer Olympics